Nicarete perrieri is a species of beetle in the family Cerambycidae. It was described by Fairmaire in 1898.

Subspecies
 Nicarete perrieri continentalis Breuning, 1949
 Nicarete perrieri perrieri (Fairmaire, 1898)

References

Desmiphorini
Beetles described in 1898